The Singapore Cycling Federation (SCF) (formerly the Singapore Amateur Cycling Association (SACA)) is the governing body for the sport of cycling in Singapore.

History
The Singapore Amateur Cycling Association (SACA) was established on 21 January 1958 as a society and was registered under the Charities Act. In 2011, it underwent a name change to the Singapore Cycling Federation to reflect a new image and objectives of the cycling fraternity to be more than just amateurs.

The SCF is recognised by Sport Singapore as the national governing body for the promotion and development of the sport of cycling. It is affiliated to the Singapore National Olympic Council, the ASEAN Cycling Association, the Asian Cycling Confederation, and the Union Cycliste Internationale.

On 3 Dec 2018, the SCF received the Charity Transparency Awards 2018 from the Charity Council.

On 4 Aug 2021, the SCF collaborated with the Singapore Cybersports & Online Gaming Association (SCOGA) to announce the setting up of a cycling esports academy. This is to promote the development of cycling esports in Singapore, and had its first demonstration cycling esports race on 7 Aug 2021.

Presidents
 2011 to 2012: Victor Yew
 2013 to 2015: Suhaimi Haji Said
 2015 to 2017: Jeffrey Goh Leng Soo
 2017 to present: Hing Siong Chen

Competition achievements

2019 Southeast Asian Games:
 Goh Choon Huat: two bronze medals for men's individual mass start road race and time trial
 Luo Yiwei: silver in team time trial

References

External links
 

National members of the Asian Cycling Confederation
Cycle racing in Singapore
Cycling
1958 establishments in Singapore
Sports organizations established in 1958
Cycle racing organizations